Euskaltel, S.A. is a Spanish telecommunications company based in Derio, Basque Country. It was formed in 1995 in a joint effort by the Basque Government and several Basque saving banks. Its name is literally translated in English as "Basque-Tel". During the Christmas of 2006, Euskaltel became rebranded as euskaltel and were at the same time adopting a new logo which depicts a stylized orange-coloured butterfly.

Euskatel operates a fibre optics network within the region, laid in collaboration with the Basque gas company. The company uses the small nearby town of Urnietatel as a testing ground.

Logo history

1995-2006

2006-2018

2018-present

Mobile virtual network operator
Although Euskaltel has its own cable network, it doesn't have a licence to use mobile phone aerials. The company has agreements with Orange España, to use their aerials for their mobile phone service. Previously it had an agreement with Vodafone to provide their service.

Corporate sponsorship
Euskaltel was the joint lead sponsor of the Basque Country's major professional cycling team, along with the regional government. The team, once one of eighteen elite teams making up the UCI ProTour, was a regular participant in the annual Tour de France and Vuelta a España, and has helped to launch the careers of many top Basque professional cyclists such as Iban Mayo and Haimar Zubeldia.

References

External links
 Bloomberg profile

Basque companies
Cable television companies of Spain
Privately held companies of Spain
Biscay
Spanish companies established in 1995